The women's madison at the 2011 Dutch National Track Championships in Apeldoorn took place at Omnisport Apeldoorn on December 30, 2011. 7 teams participated in the contest. Ellen van Dijk and Kirsten Wild
won the gold medal, Kelly Markus and Amy Pieters took silver and Vera Koedooder and Winanda Spoor won the bronze.

Competition format
Because of the number of teams, there were no qualification rounds for this discipline. Consequently, the event was run direct to the final. The competition consisted on 100 laps, making a total of 25 km.

Race
The competition started at 20:40. Ellen van Dijk and Kirsten Wild, the favourites of the race, won all the intermediate sprints. After a few round of the madison Amy Pieters attacked, but was pulled back by Van Dijk. The medalists teams lapped the other teams with at least 2 laps. Near the end of the race Van Dijk and Wild raced clear of the others.

Results

DNF = did not finish.
Results from nkbaanwielrennen.nl.

References

2011 Dutch National track cycling championships
Dutch National Track Championships – Women's madison
Dutch